Parvand may refer to:
 Parvand, Kerman
 Parvand, Razavi Khorasan
 Parvand, West Azerbaijan